Cordage may refer to:

 Rigging, cords and ropes attached to masts and sails on a ship or boat
 Rope, yarns, plies or strands twisted or braided together into a larger form

See also 

 String (disambiguation)
 Cord (disambiguation)
 Rope (disambiguation)